The Fighting Men may refer to:

 The Fighting Men (1950 film), an Italian melodrama film
 The Fighting Men (1977 film), a Canadian survival television film